Bangui Sporting Club is a Central African basketball team based in Bangui.  the team plays in the Bangui Basketball League (LBBB) and has won the championship in 2022.

Founded in 2017 as GIBA-BCAGS, under former International player Cyrille Damango, the team changed its name on April 4, 2022.

The team represented the Central African Republic in the 2023 BAL qualification, and its roster featured national team players Max Kouguere and Steven-Emile Perriere, as well as Rwandan guard Kenny Gasana and center Kendall Gray. Sporting narrowly missed out on a place in the BAL, after losing the third place game to Stade Malien.

Honours 
Bangui Basketball League

 Champions (1): 2022
 Runners-up (1): 2021

Players

2022 roster
The following is the Bangui Sporting Club roster for the 2023 BAL qualification:

Notable players 

  Kenny Gasana
  Kendall Gray
  Max Kouguère
   Jimmy Djimrabaye
  Rolly Fula Nganga

References 

Basketball teams in the Central African Republic
Basketball teams established in 2017
Bangui
Road to BAL teams